Natalia Teresa Pablos Sanchón (born 15 October 1985), known simply as Natalia, is a Spanish former footballer who played as a forward. She spent most of her club career at Rayo Vallecano and was a member of the Spain women's national team.

Club career
Until 2013 she was the captain of Rayo Vallecano women's team, where she played since the club's foundation in 2000. At Rayo, Natalia won three Leagues and one Spanish Cup.  She was the league's top scorer of the 2007-08 and 2008-09 seasons with 24 and 29 goals respectively. In November 2012, she scored her 300th goal for Rayo, including almost 200 league goals. A few months later (March 2013) she was leaving the club having scored 311 goals in 324 matches overall.

In 2013, she joined compatriot Laura del Río at Bristol Academy in the English FA WSL. Bristol manager Mark Sampson called Natalia a female version of Swansea City's Spanish striker Michu.

In October 2014 Birmingham City's Karen Carney was fined, banned for one match and sent on an education course for an incident in July with Pablos.

In December 2014 Natalia announced that she had left Bristol Academy to join Arsenal Ladies. She was an unused substitute as Arsenal won the 2016 FA Women's Cup Final at Wembley Stadium, and Natalia and her compatriots Marta Corredera and Vicky Losada all left Arsenal at the end of the 2016 FA WSL season.

International career
After winning the 2004 Under-19 Euro, she was called into the senior national team where she had a brief spell including a 2007 World Cup qualifier match against Finland and the first two matches of 2009 Euro qualifying. She subsequently renounced for personal reasons.

Natalia's goalscoring form in England during the first half of the 2013–14 WSL season saw her recalled to the national squad after a 5-year absence. Coach Ignacio Quereda included her in the 40-player pre-selection for UEFA Women's Euro 2013, but she did not feature in the final 23 player list for the tournament.

After leading the team's goalscoring in the qualifiers, she was part of Spain's squad for the 2015 FIFA Women's World Cup in Canada. But after Quereda was replaced by Jorge Vilda after the World Cup, she soon stopped being called-up along with key veterans of the team such as Sonia Bermúdez and Verónica Boquete.

International goals

Honours

Club
 Titles
 Primera División (3): 2008–09, 2009–10, 2010–11
 Copa de la Reina (1): 2008
 FA Women's Cup (1): 2015–16
 FA WSL Cup (1): 2015
 Best result in other competitions
 UEFA Champions League (Round of 16): 2010–11, 2011–12
 FA WSL (Third): 2015, 2016

International
 Titles
 UEFA U-19 Euro (1): 2004
 Best result in other competitions
 FIFA World Cup (First Stage): 2015
 FIFA U-20 World Cup (First Stage): 2004

Trivia
Her name has often been misspelled as Natalia de Pablos.

References

8. La Espartana de Vallecas. Sus 300 goles en FutFem La Espartana de Vallecas

External links

 
 
 Profile at Arsenal FC
 

1985 births
Living people
Spanish women's footballers
Spain women's international footballers
Women's association football forwards
Footballers from Madrid
Spanish expatriate women's footballers
Expatriate women's footballers in England
Bristol Academy W.F.C. players
Arsenal W.F.C. players
Women's Super League players
Primera División (women) players
Rayo Vallecano Femenino players
2015 FIFA Women's World Cup players
Spanish expatriate sportspeople in England
Spain women's youth international footballers
21st-century Spanish women